Daniel Enrique "Dani" Plomer Gordillo (born 30 November 1998) is a Spanish professional footballer who plays for Club Recreativo Granada as a left winger.

Club career
Born in Palma, Mallorca, Balearic Islands, Plomer represented Centro Internacional de Educación (CIDE), RCD Mallorca, AD Penya Arrabal and CD San Francisco as a youth. In 2017, after finishing his formation, he made his senior debut with SCD Independiente before moving to Tercera División side Club Santa Catalina Atlético in December.

On 5 July 2018, Plomer signed for UD Poblense, still in the fourth division. On 13 August of the following year, after scoring 15 goals, he joined CD Leganés and was assigned to the reserves also in division four. 

Plomer made his professional debut on 30 January 2020, coming on as a second-half substitute for Martin Braithwaite in a 0–5 away loss against FC Barcelona, for the season's Copa del Rey. On 19 August, he agreed to a two-year contract with Granada CF and was assigned to the B-team in Segunda División B.

Plomer made his first team – and La Liga – debut for the Andalusians on 8 November 2020, replacing Roberto Soldado in a 0–2 away loss against Real Sociedad, as his side was heavily impacted by the COVID-19 pandemic.

References

External links
Punto Balón Balear profile 

1998 births
Living people
Footballers from Palma de Mallorca
Spanish footballers
Association football wingers
La Liga players
Segunda División B players
Segunda Federación players
Tercera División players
Divisiones Regionales de Fútbol players
CD Leganés B players
CD Leganés players
Club Recreativo Granada players
Granada CF footballers